Justine Henin was the defending champion, but chose to compete at Sydney during the same week.

Anna Smashnova won the title by defeating Tamarine Tanasugarn 7–5, 7–6(7–2) in the final.

Seeds

Draw

Finals

Top half

Bottom half

References

External links
 Official results archive (ITF)
 Official results archive (WTA)

2002 WTA Tour
2002 Canberra Women's Classic – 1